A&E Design is a Swedish design company, founded in 1968 by the duo Tom Ahlström (born 1943) and Hans Ehrich (born 1942), after graduating from Konstfack, the University College of Arts, Crafts and Design in Stockholm.

History
Since its inception, A & E Design has focused on developing useful every day products, and are known for their practical dishwashing brushes (for Norwegian Jordan, sold in more than sixty million items), queue-ticket dispensers (for Turn-O-Matic), and a folding stool for museums - Stockholm II.

Following the disability rights movement in the 1970s, A&E Design made many designs for disabled people. Hans Ehrich also designed an electric car in the sixties.

A&E Design has received a considerable number of design awards and honours, including 14 Excellent Swedish Design Awards and 5 Red Dot Design Awards, of which three for Highest Design Quality. Among their clients are Alessi, C&B Italia, Colgate, Design House Stockholm, Lammhults, Scandinavian Airlines System, Siemens, and Zanotta.

Gallery

Bibliography 
 A&E Design – The Book, Business History Publishing, Stockholm (2018),

References

External links

A&E Design - official homepage
Red Dot interview with Swedish designer Hans Ehrich (English, Swedish).
A&E Design on Youtube (Swedish).
A&E Design's donation to Nationalmuseum in Stockholm

Design companies of Sweden
Industrial design firms
Furniture designers
Design companies established in 1968
Swedish companies established in 1968
Companies based in Stockholm